Trance is a genre of electronic dance music that emerged from the British new-age music scene and the early 1990s German techno and hardcore scenes.

Trance music is characterized by a tempo generally lying between 135–150 beats per minute (BPM), repeating melodic phrases and a musical form that distinctly builds tension and elements throughout a track often culminating in 1 to 2 "peaks" or "drops". Although trance is a genre of its own, it liberally incorporates influences from other musical styles such as techno, house, pop, chill-out, classical music, tech house, ambient and film music.

A trance is a state of hypnotism and heightened consciousness. This is portrayed in trance music by the mixing of layers with distinctly foreshadowed build-up and release. A common characteristic of trance music is a mid-song climax followed by a soft breakdown disposing of beats and percussion entirely, leaving the melody or atmospherics to stand alone for an extended period before gradually building up again. Trance tracks are often lengthy to allow for such progression and commonly have sufficiently sparse opening and closing sections to facilitate mixing by DJs.

Trance is mostly instrumental, although vocals can be mixed in: typically they are performed by mezzo-soprano to soprano female soloists, mostly without a traditional verse/chorus structure. Structured vocal form in trance music forms the basis of the vocal trance subgenre, which has been described as "grand, soaring, and operatic" and "ethereal female leads floating amongst the synths". However, male singers, such as Jonathan Mendelsohn, are also featured.<ref name="Trance Music—What is trance music?">Trance Music—What is Trance Music? https://web.archive.org/web/20140812205717/http://dancemusic.about.com/od/genres/g/Trance_Music</ref>

History

The "Trance" name may refer to an induced emotional feeling, high, euphoria, chills, or uplifting rush that listeners claim to experience, or it may indicate an actual trance-like state the earliest forms of this music attempted to emulate in the 1990s before the genre's focus changed. A writer for Billboard magazine writes, "Trance music is perhaps  best  described  as  a  mixture  of  70s  disco  and  60s  psychedelia".

Another possible antecedent is Yuzo Koshiro and Motohiro Kawashima's electronic soundtracks for the Streets of Rage series of video games from 1991 to 1994. It was promoted by the well-known UK club-night "Megatripolis" (London, at Heaven on Thursdays) whose scene catapulted it to international fame.

Examples of early trance releases include but are not limited to the UK's The KLF – What Time Is Love? (Pure Trance 1) is said to have laid the starting blocks, with its Trancey House track. German duo Jam & Spoon's 12" 1990 single "The Age of Love".and German duo Dance 2 Trance's 1993 track "We Came in Peace",.

The writer Bom Coen traces the roots of trance to Paul van Dyk's 1993 remix of Humate's "Love Stimulation". However, Van Dyk's trance origins can be traced further back to his work with Visions of Shiva, being the first tracks he released In subsequent years, one genre, vocal trance, arose as the combination of progressive elements and pop music, and the development of another subgenre, epic trance, finds some of its origins in classical music, with film music also being influential.

Trance was arguably at its commercial peak in the second part of 1990s and early 2000s. Afterwards, popular trance music providers such as Armin van Buuren's A State of Trance, Paul van Dyk, and Above & Beyond remained popular, while lesser known DJs changed to other sounds. In 2017 a new wave of underground DJs such as Nina Kraviz began incorporating trance music into their sets.

Production

Classic trance employs a 4/4 time signature, generally a tempo of 125 to 150 BPM, and 32 beat phrases and is somewhat faster than house music. A kick drum is usually placed on every downbeat and a regular open hi-hat is often placed on the upbeat. Extra percussive elements are usually added, and major transitions, builds or climaxes are often foreshadowed by lengthy "snare rolls"—a quick succession of snare drum hits that build in velocity, frequency, and volume towards the end of a measure.

Rapid arpeggios and minor keys are common features of Trance, the latter being almost universal. Trance tracks often use one central "hook", or melody, which runs through almost the entire song, repeating at intervals anywhere between 2 beats and 32 bars, in addition to harmonies and motifs in different timbres from the central melody. Instruments are added or removed every 4, 8, 16, or 32 bars.

In the section before the breakdown, the lead motif is often introduced in a sliced up and simplified form, to give the audience a "taste" of what they will hear after the breakdown. Then later, the final climax is usually "a culmination of the first part of the track mixed with the main melodic reprise".

As is the case with many dance music tracks, trance tracks are usually built with sparser intros ("mix-ins") and outros ("mix-outs") to enable DJs to blend them together immediately.

More recent forms of trance music incorporate other styles and elements of electronic music such as electro and progressive house into its production. It emphasizes harsher basslines and drum beats which decrease the importance of offbeats and focus primarily on a four on the floor stylistic house drum pattern. The BPM of more recent styles tends to be on par with house music at 120 to 135 beats per minute. However, unlike house music, recent forms of trance stay true to their melodic breakdowns and longer transitions.

Subgenres

Trance music is broken into a number of subgenres including acid trance, classic trance, hard trance, hardstyle (which is a fuse between hardcore and hard trance), progressive trance, and uplifting trance. Uplifting trance is also known as "anthem trance", "epic trance", "commercial trance",  "stadium trance", or "euphoric trance", and has been strongly influenced by classical music in the 1990s and 2000s by leading artists such as Ferry Corsten, Armin Van Buuren, Tiësto, Push, Rank 1 and at present with the development of the subgenre "orchestral uplifting trance" or "uplifting trance with symphonic orchestra" by such artists as Sound Apparel, Andy Blueman, Ciro Visone, Soundlift, Arctic Moon, and Sergey Nevone & Simon O'Shine, among others. Closely related to Uplifting Trance is Eurodance, which has become a general term for a wide variety of highly commercialized European dance music. Notably late in the 90s, German producer ATB revolutionized the scene of the aforementioned Eurodance with his hit single 9 PM (Till I Come). Several subgenres are crossovers with other major genres of electronic music. For instance, Tech trance is a mixture of trance and techno, and Vocal trance "combines [trance's] progressive elements with pop music". The dream trance genre originated in the mid-1990s, with its popularity then led by Robert Miles, who composed Children in 1996. Recently, there is also a very small subgenre called "medieval trance", which combines medieval elements together with trance elements, e.g. Maestro Giano, Green Clouds and other artists, which are effectively a kind of "reverse Bardcore".

AllMusic states on progressive trance: "the progressive wing of the trance crowd led directly to a more commercial, chart-oriented sound since trance had never enjoyed much chart action in the first place. Emphasizing the smoother sound of Eurodance or house (and occasionally more reminiscent of Jean-Michel Jarre than Basement Jaxx), Progressive Trance became the sound of the world's dance floors by the end of the millennium. Critics ridiculed its focus on predictable breakdowns and relative lack of skill to beat-mix, but progressive trance was caned by the hottest DJ."

Music festivals

The following is an incomplete list of dance music festivals that showcase trance music.

AsiaNotes: Sunburn was not the first festival/event to specialize in India in trance music. Much earlier pioneers of Goa parties held events as early as the late 80's and through all of the 1990s

 China: Spirit Tribe is a regular event outside of Kunming, Yunnan, China.
 India: The Sunburn Festival was launched in December 2007 as South Asia's first electronic music festival, and featured heavyweights like DJ Carl Cox and John '00' Fleming. Located by the seaside in Goa, on India's west coast, the festival has its roots in Goa trance, centered around Anjuna beach. Sunburn had more than 5,000 party-goers attend a three-day event in December 2008. At the 2009 festival, DJs such as Armin Van Buuren and Sander van Doorn headlined when audience numbers were approx 15,000. At the 2010 festival, when the likes of Paul Van Dyk and many other DJ's played the estimated attendance rose to about 30,000 people. The 2015 the festival achieved a record-breaking attendance with over 350,000 people attending the event to experience world-class DJ's with the likes of Martin Garrix and Afrojack.
 Thailand: Full Moon Party, since 1985. Held each month on the island of Ko Pha-ngan. Thousands of people from across the world gather on Haad Rin Nok (Sunrise Beach) to dance to trance during full moons. Transmission, originally from Prague, also holds events in Bangkok.
 Japan: Rebirth Festival
 Israel: Total Eclipse.

Europe

 Germany: Waldfrieden Wonderland, Stemwede, since 1997. The forest peace wonderland is an international open-air music festival, which takes place every year in August. The main style of music is psychedelic trance.  We Are One, Berlin, since 2010. Headed by Paul van Dyk, the event plays several different styles of trance.
 Lithuania: Yaga Gathering. A transformational festival hosted in a clearing in Ežeraitis Forest, at the edge of Spengla Lake in the Varėna District of southern Lithuania. The festival has no corporate sponsors and is financed by ticket sales. The site of the festival is about 60 kilometers (37 mi) south of Vilnius, the capital of Lithuania. Classes and activities are among the festival's other attractions, including open-air cinema, the Discovery stage featuring lectures, a Healing area with yoga and meditation sessions, a handicraft workshops area, and a children's area.
 Hungary: Ozora Festival
 Poland: Euforia Festival, Electronic Family Poland, Mayday, Sunrise Festival
 Portugal: Boom festival (the last edition was in Idanha-a-Nova), since 1997. This event is an outdoor festival running every two years with a duration of several days, focusing in psychedelic Goa trance. The festival also features workshops, presentations, and cinema. Freedom Festival; Kin and 4 Elements Festival, and many others.
 Romania: Untold Festival, Dakini Festival, SAGA Festival
 Switzerland: Street Parade, Zürich, since 1992. The world's biggest electronic music festival (more than one million visitors attend this event yearly).
 Sweden: Monday Bar Cruise has been arranged four times a year since 2002 and takes place on a 2000 people cruise ship between Stockholm and the Baltic countries. Styles include trance, psytrance, hardstyle, and hardcore.
 Belgium: Tomorrowland, Boom, since 2005. The largest Belgian open-air electronic music festival. DJs such as Armin van Buuren, Tiësto, Arty, Cosmic Gate and many more have been fixtures at the festival.
 Czech Republic: Transmission, Prague, since 2006. The biggest indoor trance music event in middle and eastern Europe. Markus Schulz is a frequent headlining performer at the event.
 Finland: Summer Sound, Helsinki, since 2011. Starting as a one-day festival in 2011 and held in Suvilahti, Helsinki, it has since grown into 3-day festival partly inside and partly outside. Every summer, DJs such as Tiësto, Armin van Buuren, and Faithless headline the event.
 Greece: Dreamland, Ancient Olympia, Elis, since 2014. An event which aims to promote different types of electronic music, culture as well as the ecological awareness. Since 2018, it takes place in the coast of Kyparissia, under the name "Mythody".
 Turkey: ANKA or Psy-ANKA and AJAX, since 2009 and 2011. Festivals which represent  different genres of electronic music are hold in Turkey annually.
 Spain: Ibiza has hosted trance parties since the 1990s.
 United Kingdom: Spiral Tribe, Tribal Gathering, Glade Festival etc; Gatecrasher also promote sporadic events and have in the past also used venues such as Birmingham N.E.C.

Netherlands

Electronic Music festivals in the Netherlands are mainly organized by four companies ALDA Events, ID&T, UDC and Q-dance:
 Armin Only, Jaarbeurs, Utrecht: As the name states, the only DJ to mix at this event is Armin van Buuren. Organized by ALDA Events. Armin Only 2005 was held in Rotterdam Ahoy. The 2008 and 2010 editions were held in Jaarbeurs Utrecht. The 2013 event was held at the Ziggo Dome, Amsterdam
 Dance Valley, Spaarnwoude: an outdoor festival organized by UDC.
 Sensation, Amsterdam Arena. Organized by ID&T.
 Energy, (Formerly Trance Energy) Jaarbeurs, Utrecht: Previously Trance only under the name "Trance Energy", the festival was renamed "Energy" in 2011 and begun to incorporate other genres. Organized by ID&T.
 Amsterdam dance event, One of the world's trance and electronic music festivals held every year at Amsterdam in October.
 A State of Trance: Armin van Buuren's weekly radio show A State of Trance celebrates every 50th episode with an event in the Netherlands, usually in Utrecht.
 Electronic Family: Organized by ALDA Events.
 Mysteryland. A series of electronic music festivals held by the Dutch promoter ID&T. Being the first of its kind in the country dates back to 1993.
 Luminosity: Amsterdam, founded in 2007. With the slogan "Spreading The Love Of Trance Music", the Luminosity Festival is organized by Luminosity Events and is attended by thousands worldwide.
 Psy-Fi: outdoor psychedelic trance festival, at Leeuwarden.

North America
Canada
 Bal en Blanc is a rave party that is hosted annually, in April during the Easter holiday weekend, in Montreal. This event usually has two separate rooms, one catering to house music and the other to trance music. It usually lasts for more than 14 hours.
 Digital Dreams Festival in Toronto featured a full trance stage in June 2014
 Escapade Music Festival hosted on Canada Day (1 July) in Ottawa
 A two-day festival called the U4RIA Trance festival in Toronto featured 23 International acts, 12 Canadian acts, and 25 hours of music in June 2018. This 2-day all trance festival was the first of its kind in Canada.
Trance Unity, hosted in Montreal, is hosted annually and usually lasts 12 to 14 hours.

United States
Electronic music festivals in the United States feature various electronic music genres such as trance, house, techno, electro, dubstep, and drum and bass:
 Fractalfest – Fractaltribe's annual outdoor psytrance festival held in Stephentown, NY. Fractaltribe is a community of artists, musicians & organizers dedicated to creating meaningful experiences and immersive atmospheres; celebrations to foster creative expression in a healthy and supportive environment through the vessel of psychedelic music and culture.
 Decadence, an annual 2-day New Year's Eve electronic dance music festival. Held at the Colorado Convention Center in Denver, it is one of the largest NYE EDM festivals in the U.S.
 Decibel Festival, an annual music and digital arts festival started in 2004 in Seattle. It is dedicated to live electronic music performance, visual art, and new media. The core of the festival comprises concerts, performances, commissioned work, film screenings, and exhibitions. The programming is presented in a variety of locations throughout Seattle, centered on the Capitol Hill neighborhood and Downtown. Since its inception, Decibel has hosted over 750 acts ranging from underground dance and experimental electronic music to transmedial art.
 Ultra Music Festival, an annual outdoor electronic music festival that occurs in March in the city of Miami, Florida. A State of Trance has frequently held milestone celebrations at the festival.
 Electric Daisy Carnival, an annual massive organized by Insomniac Events that was held in Southern California from 1997 to 2010, and was moved to Las Vegas in 2011. In 2009, the festival was expanded to a three-day event.
 Nocturnal Festival, are annual events held in Southern California organized by Insomniac Events, held at Glen Helen Regional Park in San Bernardino, California in September. Some have also been periodically held at the Downtown, Texas Amphitheater in Thorndale, Texas, just outside of Austin.
 Beyond Wonderland, an electronic dance festival in Southern California organized by Insomniac Events.
 Dreamstate, first produced by festival organizer Insomniac Events on 27–28 November 2015, at the National Orange Show in San Bernardino, California, is the first all-trance festival in North America.
 Electric Zoo Festival, an annual electronic music festival held over Labor Day weekend in New York City on Randall's Island Park. 
 Electric Forest Festival, a four-day annual festival in Michigan.
 TomorrowWorld, a three-day annual festival in Chattahoochee Hills, Georgia. Organized by ID&T, TomorrowWorld is a sister festival to Tomorrowland.
 Spring Awakening, the three-day annual festival in Chicago, Illinois.

Mexico
 Beyond Wonderland, an electronic dance festival in northern Mexico organized by Insomniac Events.

Oceania
Australia
 Doof—A type of outdoor dance party, which is generally held in a remote country area or just outside big cities in surrounding bush or rainforests and similar to raves or teknivals. Doofs generally have live electronic artists and DJs playing a range of electronic music, commonly goa trance, techno, drum and bass, and psychedelic trance.
 Defqon.1 Festival—A music festival that mostly plays hardstyle and related genres such as hardcore techno, hard house and hard trance, the event has been hosted in Sydney in mid-September since 2009 at the Sydney International Regatta Centre.
 Rainbow Serpent Festival—A large electronic music, art, and lifestyle festival, located in Victoria. The festival is mainly known for psychedelic trance and minimal techno music, but also features other genres of electronic music and non-electronic music in the smaller stages.

South America
Argentina
Creamfields BA

See also

 List of trance genres

References

Further reading
Rietveld, Arjan (2021). Hypnotised: A Journey Through Trance Music 1990-2005''. Mary Go Wild

External links

 

 
Electronic dance music genres
British styles of music
German styles of music
20th-century music genres